Euchromia is a genus of moths in the subfamily Arctiinae. The genus was erected by Jacob Hübner in 1819.

Species
 Euchromia aemulina Butler, 1877
 Euchromia amboinica Hampson, 1898
 Euchromia amoena (Möschler, 1872)
 Euchromia auranticincta Hampson, 1898
 Euchromia bourica (Boisduval, 1832)
 Euchromia cincta (Montrouzier, 1864)
 Euchromia creusa (Linnaeus, 1758)
 Euchromia cyanitis Meyrick, 1889
 Euchromia dubia (Röber, 1887)
 Euchromia folletii (Guérin-Méneville, 1832)
 Euchromia gemmata Butler, 1887
 Euchromia guineensis (Fabricius, 1775)
 Euchromia hampsoni Seitz, 1926 
 Euchromia horsfieldi (Moore, 1859)
 Euchromia irius (Boisduval, 1832)
 Euchromia isis (Boisduval, 1832)
 Euchromia jacksoni Bethune-Baker, 1911
 Euchromia lethe (Fabricius, 1775)
 Euchromia lurlina Butler, 1888
 Euchromia madagascariensis (Boisduval, 1833)
 Euchromia magna (Swinhoe, 1891)
 Euchromia mathewi Butler, 1888
 Euchromia oenone Butler, 1876
 Euchromia paula (Röber, 1887)
 Euchromia polymena (Linnaeus, 1758)
 Euchromia rubricollis (Walker, [1865])
 Euchromia schoutedeni Debauche, 1936
 Euchromia walkeri Hampson, 1898

References

Euchromiina
Moth genera